Peter Foster is a former professional rugby league footballer who played in the 1950s.

Playing career

International honours
Peter Foster won caps for Great Britain while at Leigh in 1955 against New Zealand (3 matches).

Peter Foster also represented Great Britain while at Leigh between 1952 and 1956 against France (1 non-Test match).

County Cup Final appearances
Peter Foster played  in Leigh's 6-14 defeat by Wigan in the 1951 Lancashire County Cup Final during the 1951–52 season at Station Road, Swinton on Saturday 27 October 1951.

References

External links
!Great Britain Statistics at englandrl.co.uk (statistics currently missing due to not having appeared for both Great Britain, and England)

Living people
English rugby league players
Great Britain national rugby league team players
Leigh Leopards captains
Leigh Leopards coaches
Leigh Leopards players
Place of birth missing (living people)
Rugby league locks
Year of birth missing (living people)